Christien Alexis Anholt (born 25 February 1971) is an English stage, television and film actor best known for portraying Nigel Bailey in the television series Relic Hunter. His earlier notable film roles include Marcellus alongside Mel Gibson in Franco Zeffirelli’s Hamlet (1990) and Peter Emery in Stuart Urban's Preaching to the Perverted (1997). In 2021, Anholt played T. S. Eliot in William Nunez's The Laureate depicting the life of British poet and writer Robert Graves. He is the son of actor Tony Anholt and resides in London.

Biography 
Anholt was born in London. He was working as an assistant in the gardening department at his local B&Q store in Chiswick when he received the news that he had landed the role that began his acting career in 1988 in Reunion. He was then cast as Leonard / Jeremy Lands in the Harold Pinter play Another Time. He went on to play 'Marcelus' alongside Mel Gibson in the Franco Zeffirelli film Hamlet (1990). He starred opposite Kate Beckinsale, Sam Neill and Judy Davis in the Hallmark production One Against the Wind, and alongside Stephen Dorff in The Power of One, directed by John G. Avilsden.

Steven Spielberg selected Anholt to play Clive Owen's brother in the TV series pilot Class Of '61. He appeared in the BBC's Money For Nothing. He has been featured in Seventeen opposite Rachel Weisz, and in Hard Times opposite Richard E. Grant and Sir Alan Bates and in The Harpist. This was followed by Preaching to the Perverted, The Ruby Ring, and in George Milton's Appetite. Anholt returned to the West End in Terence Rattigan's In Praise Of Love and was cast by Harold Pinter and director David Jones opposite Pinter himself, in The Hothouse.
 
In 1999 Anholt was cast as Nigel Bailey in Relic Hunter which ran for three seasons. After that Anholt guest starred in two episodes of Adventure Inc, alongside Michael Biehn, and had a cameo in The Conclave. He appeared opposite James Franco and Jean Reno in the World War One drama Flyboys, and can be seen alongside Thora Birch in Dark Corners.  In 2007 Anholt appeared in the movie, Ben 10 Race Against Time, in which he played an alien called Eon.  In more recent years he appeared in several short movies such as Severed Garden, Ghosted and Meanders.

In 2014 Anholt returned to the stage and since then he has appeared in numerous plays such as Blue Bird; Wastwater; Dog Ends; Montagu; The Two Faces of Agent Lacey; The Trial of Jane Fonda and Permanence.  He also appeared on the small screen in Doctors and Holby City.  He also does voice over work such as The Rise and Fall of Hitler.

Other endeavours

Philanthropy 
During the COVID-19 pandemic 2020 UK lockdowns, Anholt took part in Lisa Ross' 'Bedtime in Barnes' initiative by the OSO Arts Centre joining local celebrities including Alistair McGowan, Virginia McKenna, Anneka Rice and astronaut Helen Sharman. He was filmed reading four of his favourite children's stories (Pa's Soft Spot by D. A. Ellsworth; One, Two, Three! by Henry Cuyler Bunner; The Owl and the Pussycat by Edward Lear and Jabberwocky by Lewis Carroll) to help support the centre's Crisis Kitchen helping provide 10,000 meals for local people in need and the national initiative launched by Theatres Trust to prevent the permanent closure of hundreds of UK theatres.

Advertising 
In 2017, Anholt was chosen for Dubai Properties JBR's advertising campaign shot in Dubai and Abu Dhabi with billboards seen internationally on tourism sites such as on the Sheikh Zayed Road as well as commercials playing worldwide. The original YouTube upload of the commercial has almost 5 million views as of August 2021.

Personal life 
Anholt is the son of Anthony Anholt (19 January 1941 – 26 July 2002) and Sheila Anholt (née Willet), a teacher whom he married in 1964.

Filmography

Film

Television

Shorts

Voice

Theatre

Actor

Director

References

External links 
 
 
 
 

1971 births
Living people
Male actors from London
English male film actors
English male television actors
English expatriates in the United States
English people of German descent